Enkay Ogboruche, stage name Enkay, is a Nigerian singer-songwriter. She started singing at the age of 10, as a member of the Assemblies of God choir. She has two albums and many hit singles.

Biography

Personal life 
Enkay Ogboruche was born into a family of seven. Her birth name is Nkiruka Gift Onuabuobi and was born in Kaduna State in northern Nigeria. She has four siblings: two brothers and two sisters, and she is the first born child. She began singing at the age of 10. Her first recording experience was with a bottle and a spoon in a recording with her father. In her teenage years, she became a born-again Christian. Enkay is married to Dr. Timothy Ogboruche and they have three boys.

Enkay is a vocalist with a high pitched soprano that transcends 3 octaves. She is a member of the Tehila Crew, a gospel singing group. She took off in 2015 as a solo artist with a debut album Kingdom anthem. The Kingdom anthem was a 10-track album that was distributed by Honesty Music, with popular track like "Yes, You Are The Lord".

Her second album, The Bridge, was released in 2018 at the Enkay Live in Concert which held at The Eko Convention Center with the like of Kierra Sheard, Chioma Jesus, Frank Edwards, Sammy Okposo, and a host of many other gospel music artists. The Bridge contains her hit track "Salute". She has collaborated with other gospel music artists in Nigeria and internationally.

Discography

Albums 

 Jehovah – Tehila Crew (2012)
 Kingdom Anthem (2015)
 The Bridge (2018)

Sources:

Videography 

 Jehovah – Tehila Crew (2012)
 Yes You are the Lord (2016)
 You are Amazing (2016)
 Merciful God ft Mabongi Mabaso (2017)
 Salute ft Kierra Sheard (2018)
 Morning Dew (2019)
 Never Change (2019)
 Nkemakolam (2019)

References

External links
 

21st-century Nigerian women singers
Living people
Nigerian gospel singers
Year of birth missing (living people)